Brian Babilonia (born 16 September 1994) is an American cyclist. of Puerto Rican descent.

Babilonia represented the United States at the 2016 Summer Olympic road race.
At that moment, he was without a pro contract, and was the first Puerto Rican cyclist to join the road race since 1996.

Palmares
2015
3rd National Road Race Championships

References

1994 births
Living people
People from Mayagüez, Puerto Rico
Puerto Rican male cyclists
Cyclists at the 2016 Summer Olympics
Olympic cyclists of Puerto Rico